Everything is an EP released by American country music artist Chely Wright. This is Wright's first EP and first release on her own record company, Painted Red. The album features the video hit "Back of the Bottom Drawer" along with four demos. The EP also contains a DVD that includes footage personal footage and photos of Wright.

The album was released exclusively on Wright's official website; however, it was later available in major retail outlets.

Track listing

Personnel
 Kelly Back - electric guitar
 Jimmy Carter - bass guitar
 Eric Darken - percussion
 Shannon Forrest - drums
 Larry Franklin - fiddle
 Aubrey Haynie - fiddle
 Jeff Huskins - gut string guitar
 Jeff King - electric guitar
 Chris McHugh - drums
 Gordon Mote - piano
 The Nashville String Machine - strings
 Mike Rojas - piano
 Scotty Sanders - pedal steel guitar
 Bryan Sutton - acoustic guitar
 John Willis - acoustic guitar
 Chely Wright - piano, lead vocals, background vocals

References

Chely Wright albums
2004 EPs